Ann or Anne Robinson may refer to:
Ann Robinson (born 1929), American actress
Ann Robinson (artist) (born 1944), New Zealand artist
Ann Turner Robinson (died 1741), English soprano
Anne Robinson (born 1944), British TV presenter
Anne G. Robinson, Canadian operations researcher and business executive
Anne Marjorie Robinson (1858–1924), British painter and sculptor

See also
James and Anne Robinson Nature Center, in Columbia, Maryland
Annie Robinson-Pappas, fictional character in 2016 Australian television soap opera Neighbours
Robinson (disambiguation)